Andrew Lamprill (born 4 May 1969) is a former Australian rules footballer who played with Melbourne in the Australian Football League (AFL).

AFL career
Lamprill, a member of Hobart's 1990 premiership team, was selected by Melbourne with pick 10 in the 1991 National Draft. After amassing just 10 games in his first three seasons, Lamprill doubled his tally in 1995 and made 13 appearances in 1996. A defender, he played three games in 1997, late in the season, but was delisted at the end of the year.

Coaching
Lamprill went to Vermont after leaving Melbourne and was senior coach from 2001 to 2003. He then returned to Tasmania and in 2006 and 2007 was coach of Hobart.

References

External links
 
 

1969 births
Australian rules footballers from Tasmania
Melbourne Football Club players
Hobart Football Club players
Hobart Football Club coaches
Living people